Dean Creek is a stream in the U.S. state of Montana. It is a tributary to the Spotted Bear River.

Dean Creek was named after Richard Dean, a local ranger.

References

Rivers of Montana
Rivers of Flathead County, Montana